Kerrod Glenn McGregor (born 23 April 1962) is an Australian Paralympic athlete competing mainly in category P42 pentathlon events.

He was born 23 April 1962 in Gladstone, Queensland.  He competed in the 1984 Summer Paralympics in New York City, United States.  There he won a gold medal in the men's Javelin throw - A2 event, a gold medal in the men's Long jump - A2 event, a silver medal in the men's Discus throw - A2 event, finished fifth in the men's High jump - A2 event and finished fifth in the men's Shot put - A2 event.  He also competed at the 1988 Summer Paralympics in Seoul, South Korea, where he received a gold medal in the men's Discus throw - A2A9 event, a silver medal in the men's 100 metres - A2A9 event, a bronze medal in the men's Long jump - A2A9 event, a bronze medal in the men's Javelin throw - A2A9 event and finished ninth in the men's High jump - A2A9 event.  He also competed at the 1992 Summer Paralympics in Barcelona, Spain, where he received a silver medal in the men's Pentathlon - PS3 event, finished ninth in the men's 100 metres - TS1 event, finished tenth in the men's Discus throw - THS2 event, finished sixth in the men's Javelin throw - THS2 event, finished fourth in the men's Long jump - J1 event and finished sixteenth in the men's Shot put - THS2 event.  He competed in the 1996 Summer Paralympics in Atlanta, United States.  There he won a silver medal in the men's Pentathlon - P42 event.

In 2012, McGregor had successful osseointegration surgery at Macquarie University Hospital performed by Dr Munjed Al Muderis of The Osseointegration Group of Australia.

References

External links
 
 Kerrod McGregor at Australian Athletics Historical Results

1962 births
Living people
Paralympic athletes of Australia
Athletes (track and field) at the 1984 Summer Paralympics
Athletes (track and field) at the 1988 Summer Paralympics
Athletes (track and field) at the 1992 Summer Paralympics
Athletes (track and field) at the 1996 Summer Paralympics
Paralympic gold medalists for Australia
Paralympic silver medalists for Australia
Paralympic bronze medalists for Australia
Australian pentathletes
Medalists at the 1984 Summer Paralympics
Medalists at the 1988 Summer Paralympics
Medalists at the 1996 Summer Paralympics
Medalists at the 1992 Summer Paralympics
Paralympic medalists in athletics (track and field)
Australian male long jumpers
Australian male discus throwers
Australian male javelin throwers
People from Gladstone, Queensland
Long jumpers with limb difference
Discus throwers with limb difference
Javelin throwers with limb difference
Paralympic long jumpers
Paralympic discus throwers
Paralympic javelin throwers